Flor de caña ("Sugarcane Flower") is a 1948 Mexican film. It was written by Luis Alcoriza.

External links
 

1948 films
1940s Spanish-language films
Mexican black-and-white films
Films scored by Manuel Esperón
Mexican drama films
1948 drama films
1940s Mexican films